Charles Baron Clarke (17 June 1832 – 25 August 1906) was a British botanist. He was born at Andover, the eldest son of Turner Poulter Clarke.  He was educated at King's College School, London, and at Trinity and Queens' Colleges, Cambridge. He began the study of law at Lincoln's Inn in 1856 and was called to the bar in 1860. He lectured in mathematics at Presidency College, Calcutta, from 1857 to 1865. Clarke was Inspector of Schools in Eastern Bengal and later of India, and superintendent of the Calcutta Botanical Garden from 1869 to 1871. 

He retired from the Indian Civil Service in 1887. He was president of the Linnean Society from 1894 to 1896, and was elected a fellow of the Royal Society in 1882. He worked at Royal Botanic Gardens Kew until his death in 1906. He is buried in Richmond Cemetery.

There are number of plants with specific name clarkei, including Iris clarkei, Clarkella,which is a genus of flowering plants in the family Rubiaceae. and also Clarkeinda, which is a genus of fungi in the family Agaricaceae.

Bibliography 
Clarke wrote several books, including:
 The Cyperaceae of Costa Rica
 On the Indian species of Cyperus: with remarks on some others that specially illustrate the sub-divisions of the genus
 Illustrations of Cyperaceae
 Cyperaceae of the Philippines: a list of the species in the Kew Herbarium
 Philippine Acanthaceae
 The Subsubareas of British India
 Speculations From Political Economy
 A list of the flowering plants, ferns, and mosses collected in the immediate neighbourhood of Andover

References

External links
 
 

1832 births
1906 deaths
British botanists
Fellows of the Royal Society
Presidents of the Linnean Society of London
Fellows of Queens' College, Cambridge
Alumni of Queens' College, Cambridge
Burials at Richmond Cemetery